Don Caudwell  (12 September 1929 – 14 May 2006) was an Australian rules footballer who played with Collingwood in the Victorian Football League (VFL).

Notes

External links 
		
Profile on Collingwood Forever

2006 deaths
1929 births
Australian rules footballers from Victoria (Australia)
Collingwood Football Club players